George II or 2 may refer to:

People
 George II of Antioch (seventh century AD)
 George II of Armenia (late ninth century)
 George II of Abkhazia (916–960)
 Patriarch George II of Alexandria (1021–1051)
 George II of Georgia (1072–1089)
 George II of Constantinople (late twelfth century)
 Yuri II of Vladimir or George II (1189–1238)
 George II of Duklja, Prince of Duklja from 1208 to c. 1243
 George II of Bulgaria (before 1307–1322)
 George II Ghisi (d. 1352)
 George II, Prince of Anhalt-Dessau (1454–1509)
 George II of Kakheti (1464–1513)
 George II, Duke of Münsterberg-Oels (1512–1553)
 George II of Brieg (1523–1586)
 George II of Imereti (1565–1585)
 George II, Duke of Pomerania (1582–1617)
 George II, Landgrave of Hesse-Darmstadt (1605–1661)
 George II Rákóczi (1621–1660), prince of Transylvania
 George II Beseb'ely, Maronite Patriarch of Antioch in 1657–1670
 George II, Duke of Württemberg-Montbéliard (1626–1699)
 Patriarch Ignatius George II, head of the Syriac Orthodox Church in 1687–1708
 George II of Great Britain (1683–1760)
 George II Frederic (r. 1776–1801), king of the Miskito
 George II, Prince of Waldeck and Pyrmont (1789–1845)
 George II of Greece (1890–1947)

Other uses
 GEORGE 2, a version of the GEORGE operating system

See also
 George Tupou II of Tonga (1874–1918)
 Đurađ II, of Zeta (died 1403) 
 King George (disambiguation)